Ilmetovo (İlmät) is a rural locality (a selo) in Aksaitovsky Selsoviet, Tatyshlinsky District, Bashkortostan, Russia. The population was 380 as of 2010. There are 4 streets.

Geography 
Ilmetovo is located 18 km northwest of Verkhniye Tatyshly (the district's administrative centre) by road. Aksaitovo is the nearest rural locality.

References 

Rural localities in Tatyshlinsky District